Yalçınkaya is a Turkish surname. Notable people with the surname include:

 Abdurrahman Yalçınkaya, Turkish judge
 Ahmet Yalçınkaya, Turkish poet
 Atagün Yalçınkaya, Turkish boxer

Turkish-language surnames